The Rutland–Melton International CiCLE Classic is a road bicycle race that starts in Oakham and finishes in Melton Mowbray. The 2008 version was 158 km long.

The race is characterised by its off-road sections and short, sharp climbs on narrow and treacherous farm tracks – taking its inspiration from the Paris–Roubaix and Tour of Flanders. Originally part of the British Premier Calendar, from 2008 it is a 1.2 event on the UCI Europe Tour.

The race was known as the East Midlands International CiCLE Classic in the years 2007–10 when its principal sponsor was the East Midlands Development Agency.

Winners

References

External links

UCI Europe Tour races
Cycle races in England
Recurring sporting events established in 2005
2005 establishments in England
Sport in Rutland